Thutta Mutta is a 1998 Indian Kannada-language romantic drama film directed by Kishore Sarja and produced by his brother, actor Arjun Sarja.  The story was written by Richard Louis. The film cast includes Ramesh Aravind, Prema, Kasthuri and Sujatha.

The original score and soundtrack for the film were composed and written by Hamsalekha.

Cast
 Ramesh Aravind as Harsha 
 Prema as Pooja, Harsha's wife
 Kasthuri as Dr. Seema
 Sujatha as Anasuya, Harsha's mother
 Srinath 
 Tennis Krishna
 Doddanna
 Ashalatha as Kamakshamma
 B. V. Radha as Savitri, Pooja's mother
 Girija Lokesh 
 Shivarjun
Nagendra Shah 
Pramod raj 
Ramesh rao

Soundtrack
The music of the film was composed and lyrics written by Hamsalekha.

References

External links 
 
 Tutta Mutta(1998) Kannada Movie Mp3 Songs

1998 films
1990s Kannada-language films
Indian drama films
Films scored by Hamsalekha
1998 drama films
Films directed by Kishore Sarja